The 2016–17 BLNO is the 17th season of the Basketball League of Norway since its establishment.

Centrum Tigers won its second league after beating Gimle in the single-game final.

Format
The ten participating teams first played the regular season, that consisted in a round-robin schedule containing three rounds with every team playing each opponent at least once home and once away for a total of 27 matches.

At the end of the regular season, the top eight teams qualified for the playoffs. Quarterfinals and semifinals were played with a best-of-three format and the final is played as a single game.

Regular season

Playoffs
Teams better qualified in the regular season played games 2 and 3, if necessary, at home. Only in the semifinal between Kongsberg Miners and Centrum Tigers, the format of 1–1–1 was used.

References

External links
Official Norwegian Basketball Federation website

BLNO
Norway
Basketball
Basketball